The 1873 Melbourne Cup was a two-mile handicap horse race which took place on Thursday, 6 November 1873.

This year was the thirteenth running of the Melbourne Cup. Don Juan's victory was a controversial one. Immediately following the race Don Juan's victory was called into question and a protest was lodged. The Sydney Mail reported on 22 November that the protest claimed the horse was a year older than his stated four years of age. There were also rumours that Don Juan was substituted for a better horse. The protest was dismissed and the rumours were never proven. Don Juan won by three and a half lengths in a new record time of 3:36.0.

This is the list of placegetters for the 1873 Melbourne Cup.

See also

 Melbourne Cup
 List of Melbourne Cup winners
 Victoria Racing Club

References

External links
1873 Melbourne Cup footyjumpers.com

1873
Melbourne Cup
Melbourne Cup
19th century in Melbourne
1870s in Melbourne